Hey! It's James Moody is an album by saxophonist James Moody recorded in 1959 and released on the Argo label.

Reception

The Allmusic site awarded the album 3½ stars.

Track listing 
All compositions by James Moody, except as indicated
 "Stella by Starlight" (Victor Young, Ned Washington) - 3:06   
 "Indian Summer" (Al Dubin, Victor Herbert) - 2:36   
 "Don't Blame Me" (Dorothy Fields, Jimmy McHugh) - 4:29   
 "Last Train from Overbrook" - 2:36   
 "Please Say Yes" (Tom McIntosh) - 3:59   
 "Blue Jubilee" (McIntosh) - 6:16   
 "Woody N' You" (Dizzy Gillespie) - 3:12   
 "Trouble in de Lowlands" - 2:27   
 "Summertime" (George Gershwin, DuBose Heyward) - 2:30   
 "Tali" (McIntosh) - 2:49

Personnel 
James Moody - tenor saxophone, flute
Johnny Gray - guitar
Eldee Young - bass
Clarence Johnston - drums
Eddie Jefferson - vocals - (tracks 4 & 9)

References 

James Moody (saxophonist) albums
1960 albums
Argo Records albums